Boris Rađenović (born 9 August 1956) is a Serbian bobsledder. He competed at the 1984 Winter Olympics and the 2002 Winter Olympics, representing Yugoslavia.

References

1956 births
Living people
Yugoslav male bobsledders
Serbian male bobsledders
Olympic bobsledders of Yugoslavia
Bobsledders at the 1984 Winter Olympics
Bobsledders at the 2002 Winter Olympics
People from Sisak